William Antônio Rodrigues (born 1928) is a Brazilian botanist.

Life 
Rodrigues was born in São João del Rei, Brazil in 1928. He was a faculty member of the Universidade Federal do Paraná.

Work 
He collected, and described plants from Brazil.  Part of his research focused on Myristicaceae.

Legacy 
He is the authority for at least 88 taxa including:

References 

20th-century Brazilian botanists
1928 births
People from São João del-Rei
Living people